was a Japanese philosopher specialized in philosophy of religion, especially in philosophy of Buddhism and Zen. He was a professor at Kyoto University and considered a third generation member of Kyoto School (京都学派, Kyoto-gakuha).

Biography 
Shizuteru Ueda was born in Tokyo, Japan.

As the son of a Buddhist priest, he studied philosophy at Kyoto University where his mentor Keiji Nishitani oriented his studies toward medieval mystics.

He then went to Germany and received a Ph.D. degree from the University of Marburg with a thesis on the Western Christian mystic, Meister Eckhart. He returned to Kyoto University to teach philosophy of religion. In 1976, He was awarded a Doctor of Letters (文学博士, Bungaku-Hakushi).

He later focused on the thought of Kitaro Nishida. Being a Zen practitioner, Ueda—like Nishida—studied Zen Buddhism under the philosophical categories of Western philosophy. He is considered a third generation member of Kyoto School.

Family 

 His wife is Maniko Ueda (上田真而子, Maniko Ueda), who is a Japanese literary specialized in German literature.

Bibliography
 Die Gottesgeburt in der Seele und der Durchbruch zur Gottheit. Die mystische Anthropologie Meister Eckharts und ihre Konfrontation mit der Mystik des Zen-Buddhismus. Mohn, Güterloh 1965
 Zen y filosofia, Barcelona: Herder, 2004.

References
 J. C. Maraldo: Zen, Language and the Other. The Philosophy of Ueda Shizuteru. In: The Ten Directions. Edited by Zen Center of Los Angeles and The Kuroda Institut. 10:2 (1989)

References

1926 births
2019 deaths
Japanese philosophers
Academic staff of Kyoto University
Kyoto University alumni
Kyoto School
Persons of Cultural Merit